Aleksandr Svirepa (born 24 August 1999) is a Belarusian professional footballer who plays for Dinamo Minsk.

References

External links 
 
 

1999 births
Living people
People from Marjina Horka
Sportspeople from Minsk Region
Belarusian footballers
Association football defenders
FC Viktoryja Marjina Horka players
FC Energetik-BGU Minsk players
FC Dinamo Minsk players